The Réunion national badminton team represents Réunion, an overseas department and region of France, in international team competitions. The Réunion men's team reached the quarterfinals of the 2022 All Africa Men's and Women's Team Badminton Championships while the women's team were eliminated in the group stage.

The mixed team participates in the African Badminton Championships mixed team event. The Réunion men's and women's team also participates in the Indian Ocean Island Games.

Participation in BCA competitions 

Men's team

Women's team

Mixed team

List of medalists

Participation in Indian Ocean Island Games 

Men's team

Women's team

Current squad 

Male players
Aaron Assing
Xavier Chan Fung Ting
Gregory Grondin
Loic Antoine Nanicaoudin

Female players
Chai Ly-hoa
Audrey Lebon
Estelle Leperlier
Mathilde Lepetit

References 

Badminton
National badminton teams
Badminton in Réunion